Chionodes nephelophracta is a moth in the family Gelechiidae. It is found in Costa Rica.

References

Chionodes
Moths described in 1932
Moths of Central America